The Mexican Trade Services Documentation and Cultural Office (Spanish: Oficina de Enlace de México) represents interests of Mexico in Taiwan in the absence of formal diplomatic relations, functioning as a de facto embassy. Its counterpart in Mexico is the Taipei Economic and Cultural Office in Mexico in Mexico City. 

The Office is headed by the Minister, Martin Torres Gutierrez Rubio.

See also
 Mexico–Taiwan relations
 List of diplomatic missions in Taiwan
 List of diplomatic missions of Mexico

References

External links
 

Taipei
Representative Offices in Taipei